The Daingerfield Handicap was an American long distance Thoroughbred horse race held annually from 1941 through 1953 at Jamaica Race Course, Jamaica, Queens, New York. Run on dirt for horses age three and older, for the first two years it was contested at two miles after which the distance was set at two and one-sixteenth miles.

The race was created to honor Algernon Daingerfield, a Secretary of The Jockey Club for many years who had died on June 10, 1941.

Historical notes
The inaugural running took place on October 25, 1941 at Empire City Race Track in Yonkers, New York. The two-mile event was won by Marshall Field's Piping Rock and was run at a distance of two miles. The race remained at Empire City for another year after which it was moved to the Jamaica Race Course in 1943 where the distance was increased to two miles and a sixteenth making it the longest race ever run at Jamaica.

In the 1950 edition of the Daingerfield Handicap, Canadian-born jockey Ted Atkinson rode Royal Castle to victory in a world record time of 3:30 4/5 for two and one-sixteenth miles on dirt.

The final running of the Daingerfield Handicap took place on November 11, 1953. It was won by a three-year-old colt named Guy with another Canadian-born jockey, Nick Wall, on board.

Records
Speed record:
 3:30 2/5 @ 2  miles: Royal Castle (1950) (new world record on dirt)

Most wins:
 no horse won this race more than once

Most wins by a jockey:
 2 – Ted Atkinson (1945, 1950)

Most wins by a trainer:
 2 – Sol Rutchick (1945, 1947)

Most wins by an owner:
 no owner won this race more than once

Winners

Past and present North American marathon races
On dirt: 
 Annual Champion Stakes
 Display Handicap 
 Empire City Gold Cup
 Gallant Fox Handicap
 Gallant Man Handicap
 Brooklyn Handicap
 Fort Harrod Stakes
 Tokyo City Cup
 Valedictory Stakes

On turf:
 American St. Leger Stakes
 Canadian International Stakes
 Carleton F. Burke Handicap
 San Juan Capistrano Handicap

References

Discontinued horse races in New York (state)
Open long distance horse races
Jamaica Race Course
1941 establishments in New York City
1953 disestablishments in New York (state)
Recurring sporting events established in 1941
Recurring events disestablished in 1953